The economy of Curaçao is a high income economy, as defined by the World Bank. The island has a well-developed infrastructure with strong tourism and financial services sectors. Shipping, international trade, oil refining, and other activities related to the port of Willemstad (like the Free Trade Zone) also make a significant contribution to the economy.

Curaçao has one of the highest standards of living in the Caribbean, ranking 46th in the world in terms of GDP (PPP) per capita and 28th in the world in terms of nominal GDP per capita.

To achieve the government's aim to make its economy more diverse, efforts are being made to attract more foreign investment. This policy, called the 'Open Arms' policy, features a heavy focus on information technology companies.

History

Early in its history, Curaçao's economy was  centered on salt mining from saline-rich ponds located in the eastern part of the island. Up until that time, dating back to the 16th century, settlers (first Spanish and later Dutch) made numerous, failed attempts at creating an agricultural industry. Curaçao's arid climate, which features few freshwater sources, made it difficult and unprofitable.

Although the island's geography was at first considered an obstacle economically, it later proved to be invaluable due to its ideal location for trade and commerce. Shipping and trading operations  centered on the port of Willemstad played an important role in the development of the economy.

In the early 20th century, discovery of oil in Venezuela caused major oil companies to invest in the region. Beginning in 1920, oil refining has become a key part of the island's economy, representing nearly 90% of its exports.

During WWII, Curaçao was a safe-haven for Dutch multi-national companies, beginning the island's history as a financial services center.

Tourism is also becoming an increasingly important sector of the economy. The construction of the Mega Pier has recently allowed larger cruise ships to dock at Curaçao, increasing its position as a tourism destination.

Tourism

Curaçao is a popular tourism location for the Eastern United States, South America, the Netherlands and Germany. It leads the Caribbean in cruise tourism growth with 610,186 cruise passengers in 2013, a 41.4% increase over the prior year. Hato International Airport received 1,772,501 passengers in 2013 and recently announced $48 million in capital investments aimed at transforming the airport into a regional hub by 2018. Beginning in early 2014, the Lynx rocketplane is expected to be flying suborbital space tourism flights and scientific research missions from a new spaceport on Curaçao. The island lies outside of the Hurricane belt and has a well-developed tourism infrastructure.

Curaçao's coast has a sharp drop-off known as the "Blue Edge" which makes it a popular scuba diving destination. Coral reefs for snorkeling and scuba diving can be reached without a boat. The southern coast has calm waters as well as many small beaches, such as Jan Thiel and Cas Abou. The coastline of Curaçao features numerous bays and inlets which serve as popular mooring locations for boats.

Some of the coral reefs are affected by tourism. Porto Marie Beach is experimenting with artificial coral reefs in order to improve the reef's condition. Hundreds of artificial coral blocks that have been placed are now home to a large array of tropical fish.

Oil refining

The discovery of oil in the Maracaibo Basin of Venezuela in the early 20th century forced the Venezuelan government to search for ideal locations for large scale refining. The refinery is located in the Schottegat, the natural harbour beyond Willemstad and began operating in 1918.

Venezuela's state oil company, Petróleos de Venezuela (PDVSA) operated the Isla refinery, which had a 320,000 barrel per day capacity until it closed in 2019. 

In 2017, negotiations were underway with a Chinese company,  (GZE). In July, the discussions were suspended but Prime Minister Rhuggenaath announced that he would travel to China later in the year to reopen negotiations.

Financial services
Curaçao's history in financial services dates from World War I with the conversion of the financial arms of local merchant houses into commercial banks. As the economy grew, these banks began assuming additional functions eventually becoming full-fledged financial institutions. The Dutch Caribbean Securities Exchange is located in the capital of Willemstad, as is the Central Bank of Curaçao and Sint Maarten; the latter of which dates to 1828 making it the oldest central bank in the Western Hemisphere. The island's legal system supports a wide variety of corporate structures and is a popular corporate haven. Curaçao is considered a tax haven yet it adheres to the EU Code of Conduct against harmful tax practices. It holds a qualified intermediary status from the United States I.R.S. and is an accepted jurisdiction of the OECD and Caribbean Financial Action Task Force on Money Laundering. The country strongly enforces Anti-Money Laundering and Counter-Terrorism funding compliance.

See also

 Curaçao Economy
 Economy of the Caribbean
 Caribbean guilder
 Central Bank of Curaçao and Sint Maarten
 Central banks and currencies of the Caribbean
 Dutch Caribbean Securities Exchange
 List of countries by credit rating
 List of Latin American and Caribbean countries by GDP (nominal)
 List of Latin American and Caribbean countries by GDP (PPP)
 List of countries by tax revenue as percentage of GDP
 List of countries by future gross government debt
 List of countries by leading trade partners

References